Australian rules football in Tonga has its origins in local schools the 1980s, but has been played on an organised basis only since 2003, when the game's governing body, the Tonga Australian Football Association was founded.

There are currently approximately 150 or more Tongans regularly playing Australian rules football.

Tonga's senior team competed internationally at their  2011 Australian Football International Cup debut achieving the highly creditable position of ninth out of 18 teams defeating many more fancied teams..

History
The first Australian rules football believed to have been played in Tonga was during the Christmas break of 1985–1986, when a Melbourne teacher named Denis Towers visited the country briefly with his Tongan-born wife, and played the game with some 40 Tongan men from the local villages of Hautu-Fahefa on the grounds of the local primary school.

Further, during the late 1990s, Ewen Gracie, a former Melbourne primary school and sports teacher, also spent a few years employed at Liahona High School, in Tonga, during which time he also made time to teach young Tongans the skills of the Australian football game.

A schools competition has been played yearly since then, including a tour to Samoa. Development officers from Australia have visited to islands to assist in creating development programs.

In 2006 the first TAFA PTH junior scholarship was awarded to Alex Fungavaka who was placed at Norwood Morialta High School in Adelaide.

International competition
The senior men's representative team is known as the Black Marlins and hosted Australian amateur team the Fitzroy Reds in late 2006.  A team representing the Melbourne Tongan community also competed at the 2004 Australian Football Multicultural Cup.

Although the Black Marlins could not commit to the full draw of the 2008 Australian Football International Cup, the Tongan side did arrive in Australia and participate in the multicultural division of the competition against Team Africa.

Notable players with connections to Tonga

References

External links
Tonga Australian Football Association

Ton
Sport in Tonga by sport